Junshan Yinzhen (Standard Chinese pronunciation ) is a yellow tea from Junshan Island of the Hunan Province in China. It is considered to be China's rarest tea and one of the Ten Chinese Famous Teas.

Although the same kind of tea trees are also planted around Dongting Lake, where Junshan Island is located, those teas should not be called Junshan Yinzhen. The tea resembles the White tea Yinzhen known as Bai Hao Yinzhen. Junshan Yinzhen, allegedly the preferred tea of Chairman Mao Zedong, is a rare tea sometimes sold as White tea.

See also
 Baihao Yinzhen
 China Famous Tea

References

Junshan District
Yellow tea
Chinese teas
Chinese tea grown in Hunan